The Cox-Klemin Aircraft Corporation was an American aircraft manufacturer based in Long Island, New York in the 1920s.

History
It was founded by Charles Cox and Alexander Klemin (a professor at New York University) in College Point, New York. The company took over an ordnance plant in Baldwin, New York in 1924. Later that year, it partnered with Ernst Heinkel to design and build a mailplane.

In defiance of prohibition, the company christened its new Nighthawk airplane using champagne in 1925.

The company filed for bankruptcy in 1925. However, bankruptcy proceedings continued into 1926. The case was further delayed after the court could not locate company management.

Grumman would later open its first plant in the shuttered Cox-Klemin factory in 1930.

Aircraft

References

Defunct aircraft manufacturers of the United States
Vehicle manufacturing companies established in 1921
Vehicle manufacturing companies disestablished in 1925
Defunct manufacturing companies based in New York City
Companies based in Queens, New York
1921 establishments in New York (state)
1925 disestablishments in New York (state)
American companies disestablished in 1925
American companies established in 1921